The 1928 United States presidential election was the 36th quadrennial presidential election, held on Tuesday, November 6, 1928. Republican Secretary of Commerce Herbert Hoover defeated the Democratic nominee, Governor Al Smith of New York. After President Calvin Coolidge declined to seek reelection, Hoover emerged as his party's frontrunner. As Hoover's party opponents failed to unite around a candidate, Hoover received a large majority of the vote at the 1928 Republican National Convention. The strong state of the economy discouraged some Democrats from running, and Smith was nominated on the first ballot of the 1928 Democratic National Convention. Hoover and Smith had been widely known as potential presidential candidates long before the 1928 campaign, and both were generally regarded as outstanding leaders. Both were newcomers to the presidential race and presented in their person and record an appeal of unknown potency to the electorate. Both faced serious discontent within their respective parties' membership, and both lacked the wholehearted support of their parties' organization.

In the end, the Republicans were identified with the booming economy of the 1920s, and Smith, a Roman Catholic, suffered politically from anti-Catholic prejudice, his opposition to Prohibition, and his association with the legacy of corruption by Tammany Hall. Hoover won a third straight Republican landslide and made substantial inroads in the traditionally-Democratic Solid South by winning several states that had not voted for a Republican since the end of Reconstruction. Hoover's victory made him the first president born west of the Mississippi River, and he is the most recent sitting member of the Cabinet to win a presidential election. Charles Curtis was elected vice president, becoming the first Native American and the first person with acknowledged non-European ancestry to reach that office, a feat that was not repeated until 2020, when Kamala Harris became vice president under President Joe Biden. Hoover was the last Republican to win a presidential election until 1952.

Nominations

Republican Party nomination

Other Candidates 

With President Calvin Coolidge choosing not to enter the race, the race for the nomination was wide open. The leading candidates were Secretary of Commerce Herbert Hoover, former Illinois Governor Frank Orren Lowden and Senate Majority Leader Charles Curtis. A movement to draft Coolidge failed to gain traction with party insiders or even persuade Coolidge himself.

In the few primaries that mattered, Hoover did not perform as well as expected, and it was thought that President Coolidge or Vice President Charles G. Dawes might accept a draft in case of a deadlock, but Lowden withdrew just as the convention was about to start, paving the way for a Hoover victory.

The Republican Convention was held in Kansas City, Missouri from June 12 to 15 and nominated Hoover on the first ballot. With Hoover disinclined to interfere in the selection of his running mate, the party leaders were at first partial to giving Dawes a shot at a second term, but when that information leaked, Coolidge sent an angry telegram that said that he would consider a second nomination for Dawes, whom he hated, a "personal affront." To attract votes from farmers who were concerned about Hoover's pro-business orientation, the nomination was instead offered to Curtis. He accepted and was nominated overwhelmingly on the first ballot.  Curtis was the first candidate of Native American ancestry nominated by a major party for national office.

In his acceptance speech eight weeks after the convention ended, Hoover said: "We in America today are nearer to the final triumph over poverty than ever before in the history of this land... We shall soon with the help of God be in sight of the day when poverty will be banished from this land." That sentence would haunt Hoover during the Great Depression.

Democratic Party nomination

Other candidates 

Owing to the economic prosperity in the country and rapidly fading public memory of the Teapot Dome scandal, the Democratic Party's prospects looked dim. Most of the major Democratic leaders, such as William Gibbs McAdoo, were therefore content to sit out the election. One who did not do so was New York Governor Al Smith, who had previously made two attempts to secure the Democratic nomination.

The 1928 Democratic National Convention was held in Houston, Texas, on June 26 to 28, and Smith became the candidate on the first ballot.

The leadership asked the delegates to nominate Senator Joseph Taylor Robinson of Arkansas, in many ways Smith's political polar opposite, to be his running mate, and Robinson was nominated for vice-president.

Smith was the first Roman Catholic to gain a major party's nomination for president, and his religion became an issue during the campaign. Many Protestants feared that Smith would take orders from church leaders in the Vatican in making decisions affecting the country.

Other candidates

Socialist Party

Held in the Finnish Socialist Hall in New York City, the eighth Socialist Party Convention met on the thirteenth of April. James Maurer, a former State Representative, President of the Pennsylvania Federation of Labor and then Councilman for the town of Reading, was widely considered the frontrunner in the months before the convention met. For his boomers however, Maurer stood that his duties as councilman precluded the possibility of any national tour that would be required of his nomination for the Presidency, and this was declination was made definitive on April tenth. Norman Thomas, a Presbyterian minister who had been one of Maurer's boomers and had himself made it known that he was not a candidate for the Socialist nomination rather swiftly became the new frontrunner, and plans were made for a draft effort. Thomas and Maurer were nominated unanimously for president and Vice President respectively, with both men accepting their nominations. The only trouble arose on the question of Prohibition, where there remained a split in the Party between those who supported the Eighteenth Amendment and those, like Convention Chair Victor Berger, who preferred that it be handled on a state-by-state basis. In the end it was agreed that the Party remain silent on the issue of Prohibition.

Workers (Communist) Party

Held in the Mecca Temple in New York City, the second Workers' Party Convention met on the twenty-fifth of May. Jay Lovestone served as the convention's keynote speaker, denouncing the Democratic, Republican and Socialist Parties and claiming that the Communists would turn the next "imperialist war" into a civil war. Party Chair William Foster was named as the Party's candidate for the Presidency while Benjamin Gitlow, a former opponent of Foster's within the Party, was named as its candidate for vice president. Scott Nearing was also considered a possible contender for either position on ticket. A platform was adopted which, in addition to calling for American workers to overthrow the capitalistic system of government, also demanded the enactment of social insurance, the repeal of the Eighteenth Amendment and the Volstead Act, a five-hour workday, the withdrawal of troops from Nicaragua and China, and the recognition of the Soviet Union.

Socialist Labor Party

Held in New York City, the tenth Socialist Labor Party Convention met on the twelfth of May. Initially the ticket was a duplicate of the one nominated four years prior, Frank Johns of Oregon for the Presidency and Verne Reynolds of Michigan for Vice President; however Johns, while campaigning in Bend, Oregon, died while attempting to rescue a young boy who had fallen into the river shortly after one of his opening campaign events. With their standard-bearer having passed, the executive committee of the Party tendered the presidential nomination to Reynolds, with the place of vice presidential nominee being filled by Jeremiah Crowley of New York. Speaking of the "decay of the Capitalistic System", Reynolds campaigned on the idea of Industrial democracy.

Prohibition Party

Held at the La Salle Hotel in Chicago, the fifteenth Prohibition Party Convention met on the tenth of July. Dr. D. Leigh Colvin and other Prohibitionists had found both the Republican and Democratic planks regarding Prohibition as unsatisfactory, and there was open discussion of nominating a ticket despite the continued reversals the Party had suffered since 1920. The name of former Governor Gifford Pinchot of Pennsylvania was bandied about as a potential contender, though there were those like Colvin who wanted to take advantage of the Democrat's nomination of a Wet Catholic by nominating a Dry Southern Democrat to the head of the ticket in the hopes of carrying one of the Southern states; William Gibbs McAdoo, Senator Robert Owen of Oklahoma, and former IRS Commissioner Daniel Roper were other names considered for a draft. A merger with the Farmer-Labor Party was contemplated for a time, and a committee was appointed which named a potential ticket of Gifford Pinchot for President and former Governor William Ellery Sweet of Colorado for Vice President; however neither man responded to inquiries whether they would accept the nomination, and eventually both the Prohibition and Farmer-Labor Parties tabled motions calling for fusion.

There remained immense pressure within the Party to name Herbert Hoover as their choice for president despite his dithering on the issue of Prohibition enforcement in the eyes of the stricter Drys, and indeed when the balloting for the presidential nomination commenced Hoover was found to be the second most popular choice of the delegates. Those opposed to Hoover rallied on the second ballot however behind frontrunner William Varnery, an insurance salesman and party regular from New York. James Edgerton, a Virginian native who had headed the Jefferson-Lincoln League in the failed effort to fuse the Prohibition and Farmer-Labor Parties, was nominated for the Vice Presidency. An olive branch was still offered to Hoover however, with the Prohibition Party promising to withdraw their ticket and endorse his candidacy were he make a public declaration in favor of Prohibition, that they would uphold the Volstead Act, and that they would present legislation to better enforce both during their term as president. Indeed, there remained a concerted effort to withdraw the ticket from the race, resulting in a meeting by the Party National Executive Committee on whether Varney should drop out. Varney himself was opposed to this plan, and in a narrow vote, four to three, the effort to effectively endorse Hoover for the Presidency failed. Still, there remained a concern that the ticket might potentially spoil the race and accidentally result in Smith's election to the Presidency, and so care was taken to avoid any repeat of 1884; Prohibition Party electors were not filed in New York, and Varney and Edgerton were to confine their campaigning to the Solid South and the Border States, reasoning that many Dry Democrats there might still vote for Smith unless they were given a third option.

Farmer-Labor Party

Held in Chicago, the third Farmer-Labor Party Convention met on the tenth of July. A merger with the Prohibition Party was contemplated for a time, and a committee was appointed which named a potential ticket of Gifford Pinchot for president and former Governor William Ellery Sweet of Colorado for Vice President; however neither man responded to inquiries whether they would accept the nomination, and eventually both the Farmer-Labor and Prohibition Parties tabled motions calling for fusion. Initially the Party had nominated Senator George Norris of Nebraska for President, but Norris adhered to an earlier declaration that he had made where he felt that the political machinery necessary to wage a successful campaign for the Presidency was not possible to establish so late in the campaigning season. To run alongside Norris the Party had named William J. Vereen of Georgia, a cotton textile manufacturer, but refused to consider his nomination under any circumstances once the press had brought it to his attention. Some months later the Presidential nomination was tendered to Colonel Frank Elbridge Webb of California, with the Vice Presidential nomination being offered to Senator James Reed of Missouri after Webb rejected the idea of potentially running with Senator James Heflin of Alabama; as with Vereen, Reed had no prior knowledge of his impending nomination and wholly rejected it. A third man, Dr. Henry Alexaner of North Carolina was then nominated in Reed's stead, but on September 25 Alexander requested that his name be withdrawn from the ticket and that he would be endorsing Al Smith for the Presidency. At some point after LeRoy Tillman, a nephew of the late Senator Benjamin Tillman of South Carolina, was nominated in Alexander's stead.

General election

Fall campaign 
Anti-Catholicism was a significant problem for Smith's campaign. Protestant ministers warned that he would take orders from the Pope, who many Americans sincerely believed would move to the United States to rule the country from a fortress in Washington, DC. A popular joke of the time was that Smith sent a one-word telegram after the election to Pope Pius XI saying, "Unpack." Beyond the conspiracy theories, a survey of 8,500 Southern Methodist Church ministers found only four who supported Smith, and the northern Methodists, Southern Baptists, and Disciples of Christ were similar in their opposition. Many voters who sincerely rejected bigotry and the anti-Catholic Ku Klux Klan, which had declined during the 1920s until the 1928 campaign revived it, justified their opposition to Smith on their belief that the Catholic Church was an "un-American" and "alien culture" that opposed freedom and democracy.

An example was a statement issued in September 1928 by the National Lutheran Editors' and Managers' Association that opposed Smith's election. The manifesto, written by Dr. Clarence Reinhold Tappert, warned about "the peculiar relation in which a faithful Catholic stands and the absolute allegiance he owes to a 'foreign sovereign' who does not only 'claim' supremacy also in secular affairs as a matter of principle and theory but who, time and again, has endeavored to put this claim into practical operation." The Catholic Church, the manifesto asserted, was hostile to American principles of separation of church and state and of religious toleration. Groups circulated a million copies of a counterfeit oath, claiming that fourth-degree Knights of Columbus members swore to exterminate Freemasons and Protestants and to commit violence against anyone if the church ordered. Smith's opposition to Prohibition, a key reform promoted by Protestants, also lost him votes, as did his association with Tammany Hall. Because many anti-Catholics used the issues to cover for their religious prejudices, Smith's campaign had difficulty denouncing anti-Catholicism as bigotry without offending others who favored Prohibition or disliked Tammany corruption.

Scott Farris notes that the anti-Catholicism of the American society was the sole reason behind Smith's defeat, as even contemporary Prohibition activists would admit that their main problem with the Democratic candidate was his faith and not any political view - Bob Jones Sr., a prominent Protestant pastor in South Carolina, said: “I’ll tell you, brother, that the big issue we’ve got to face ain’t the liquor question. I’d rather see a saloon on every corner of the South than see the foreigners elect Al Smith president.” A Methodist newspaper in Georgia called Catholicism “a degenerate type of Christianity,” while Southern Baptist churches ordered their followers to vote against Smith, claiming that he would close down Protestant churches, end freedom of worship and prohibit reading the Bible. Charles Hillman Fountain, a Protestant writer, insisted that Catholics should be barred from holding any office. Farris states that "More disturbing than the ridiculous and the dangerous was the respectable anti-Catholicism", as contemporary newspapers and Protestant churches tried to mask their anti-Catholicism as genuine concern. Protestant activists insisted that Catholicism represented an alien culture and medieval mentality, claiming that Catholicism was incompatible with American democracy and institutions. Catholics were portrayed as reactionary despite being more left-wing than mainstream American Protestant congregations at the time. William Allen White, a renowned newspaper editor, warned that Catholicism would erode the moral standards of America, saying that “the whole Puritan civilization which has built a sturdy, orderly nation is threatened by Smith.” While Herbert Hoover avoided raising the issue of Catholicism on the campaign trail, he defended the Protestant actions in a private letter:

Those issues made Smith lose several states of the Solid South that had been carried by Democrats since Reconstruction. However, in many southern states with sizable African American populations, the vast majority of whom could not vote due to poll taxes, restricted primaries, and hostile local election officials, it was widely believed that Hoover supported integration or at least was not committed to maintaining segregation. This overcame opposition to Smith's campaign in areas with large nonvoting black populations. Mississippi Governor Theodore G. Bilbo claimed that Hoover had met with a black member of the Republican National Committee and danced with her. Hoover's campaign quickly denied the "untruthful and ignoble assertion."

Smith's religion helped him with Roman Catholic New England immigrants, especially Irish-Americans and Italian-Americans, which may have explained his narrow victories in traditionally-Republican Massachusetts and Rhode Island and his narrow loss in his home state of New York, where previous Democratic presidential candidates had lost by double digits, but Smith lost by only 2%.

Results 

The total vote exceeded that of 1924 by nearly eight million, which was nearly twice the vote cast in 1916 and nearly three times that of 1896. Every section in the Union increased its vote although the Mountain, East South Central and West South Central States did so least of all. The greatest increases were in the heavily populated (Northeastern) Mid-Atlantic and East North Central States, where more than 4,250,000 more votes were cast, more than half of the nationwide increase. There was an increase of over a million each in New York and Pennsylvania.
Much of the increase could be attributed to women voting in ever increasing numbers since gaining the national vote in 1920.

Hoover won 200 counties in the Southern United States while Smith won 122 traditionally Republican counties in the Northern United States, with 77 of those counties being majority Catholic. Warren G. Harding had won in all twelve cities with populations above 500,000 in the 1920 election, but Smith won in Cleveland, Milwaukee, New York City, San Francisco, and St. Louis, and lost in Baltimore and Pittsburgh by less than 10,000 votes. Hoover won in the traditionally Democratic Birmingham, Dallas, and Houston. Smith was the first Democratic nominee in the 20th century to win a majority of the twelve largest cities in the country. The net vote totals in the twelve largest cities shifted from Republican to Democratic with Harding having won by 1,540,000 in 1920, Coolidge by 1,308,000 in 1924, while Smith won by 210,000. Samuel Lubell wrote in The Future of American Politics that Franklin D. Roosevelt's victory in the 1932 election was preceded by Smith's increased vote totals in urban areas.

Smith's results in the cities in the election improved upon John W. Davis' results in the 1924 election. The Democratic vote in Boston rose from 35.5% to 66.8%, in Milwaukee from 9.7% to 53.7%, in Saint Paul, Minnesota from 10.1% to 51.2%, San Francisco from 6.4% to 49.4%, in Cleveland from 9.1% to 45.6%, in Chicago from 20.3% to 46.5%, in Pittsburgh from 8.7% to 42.4%, in Philadelphia from 12.1% to 39.5%, in Minneapolis from 6.3% to 38.8%, in Detroit from 7.1% to 36.8%, and in Seattle from 6.6% to 31.9%. In the boroughs of New York City the vote percentages rose from 33.6% to 67.7% in The Bronx, 39.6% to 60.8% in Manhattan, 31.9% to 59.5% in Brooklyn, 31% to 53.4% in Queens, and 42% to 53.4% in Staten Island. He improved in all of those cities from James M. Cox's results in 1920.

Hoover won the election by a wide margin on pledges to continue the economic boom of the Coolidge years. He received more votes than any previous candidate of the Republican Party in every state except five: Rhode Island, Iowa, North Dakota, South Carolina, and Tennessee. The Hoover vote was greater than the Coolidge vote in 2,932 counties; it was less in 143 of the comparable counties. The 21,400,000 votes cast for Hoover also touched the high-water mark for all votes for a presidential candidate until then and were an increase of more than 5,500,000 over the Coolidge vote four years earlier. The Republican ticket made substantial inroads in the South: the heaviest Democratic losses were in the three Southern sections (South Atlantic, East South Central, West South Central). The losses included 215 counties that had never before supported a Republican presidential candidate, distributed as follows: Alabama (14), Arkansas (5), Florida (22), Georgia (4), Kentucky (28), Maryland (3), Mississippi (1), Missouri (10), North Carolina (16), Tennessee (3), Texas (64), Virginia (26), West Virginia (4). In Georgia, eight counties recorded more votes cast for "anti-Smith" electors than either major-party candidate,.

The electoral votes of North Carolina and Virginia had not been awarded to a Republican since 1872, and Florida had not been carried by a Republican since the heavily disputed election of 1876. Texas was carried by a Republican for the first time in its history, which left Georgia as the only remaining state never carried by a Republican presidential candidate. Georgia would not be won by a Republican until 1964 when Barry Goldwater carried the Peach State. Smith carried traditionally Democratic Alabama by barely 7,000 votes.  In all, Smith carried only six of the eleven states of the former Confederacy, the fewest carried by a Democratic candidate since the end of Reconstruction.

Smith polled more votes than had any previous Democratic candidate in 30 of the 48 states, all but Alabama, Colorado, Delaware, Idaho, Kansas, Kentucky, Montana, Nevada, New Mexico, North Carolina, Oklahoma, Oregon, South Carolina, Tennessee, Texas, Utah, Virginia, and Washington. In only four of them (Tennessee, Oklahoma, Texas, and New Mexico) did Smith receive fewer votes than Davis had in 1924. Historian Allan Lichtman notes that since the sole defining issue of the election was anti-Catholicism, it radically realigned states' voting patterns. States that have never voted Republican after Reconstruction such as Texas, Florida, North Carolina, and Virginia voted for Hoover, while Smith carried Massachusetts and Rhode Island - states that have never voted Democrat before save for 1912. Lichtman further proves this by pointing out that Smith and Hoover had very similar political views save for religion and Prohibition, and yet the 1928 election had a turnout of 57%, despite previous 1920s American elections having their turnouts below 50%.

Smith received nearly as many votes as Coolidge had in 1924, and his vote exceeded Davis's by more than 6,500,000. The Democratic vote was greater than in 1924 in 2080 counties and fell in 997 counties. In only one section did the Democratic vote drop below 38%, the Pacific, which was the only one in which the Republican vote exceeded 60%. However, the Democrats made gains in five sections; of those counties, fourteen had never been Democratic and seven had been Democratic only once. The size and the nature of the distribution of the Democratic vote illustrated Smith's strengths and weaknesses as a candidate. Despite evidence of an increased Democratic vote, Smith's overwhelming defeat in the electoral college and the retention of so few Democratic counties reflected Hoover's greater appeal. Smith won the electoral votes of only the Deep South of the Democratic Solid South, Robinson's home state of Arkansas, and the New England states of Massachusetts and Rhode Island, both of which had a large proportion of Catholic voters. His 87 electoral votes were the fewest that a Democratic candidate had won since the 80 votes earned by Horatio Seymour in 1868. Hoover even carried Smith's home state of New York by a narrow margin. Smith carried 914 counties, the fewest in the Fourth Party System. The Republican total leaped to 2,174 counties, a larger number than even the 1920 landslide.

Third-party support sank almost to the vanishing point, as the election of 1928 proved to be a two-party contest to a greater extent than any other in the Fourth Party System. Until the major split before the 1948 election in the Democratic Party between Southern Democrats and the more liberal Northern faction, no further significant third-party candidacies as seen in 1912 and 1924 were to occur. All "other" votes totaled only 1.08 percent of the national popular vote. The Socialist vote sank to 267,478, and in seven states, there were no Socialist votes.

It was the last election in which the Republicans won North Carolina until 1968, the last in which they won Kentucky and West Virginia until 1956, the last in which they won Arizona, California, Florida, Idaho, Illinois, Minnesota, Missouri, Montana, Nevada, New Mexico, Oklahoma, Tennessee, Texas, Utah, Virginia, and Washington until 1952, the last in which they won Maryland, New Jersey, New York, and Oregon until 1948, and the last in which they won Ohio, Wisconsin, and Wyoming until 1944.

Source (Popular Vote): 

Source (Electoral Vote):

Geography of results

Cartographic gallery

Results by state

Close states 
Margin of victory less than 1% (5 electoral votes):
 Rhode Island, 0.61% (1,451 votes)

Margin of victory less than 5% (95 electoral votes):
 Massachusetts, 1.09% (17,192 votes)
 New York, 2.35% (103,481 votes)
 Alabama, 2.84% (7,072 votes)
 Texas, 3.67% (26,004 votes)

Margin of victory between 5% and 10% (60 electoral votes):
 Utah, 7.72% (13,633 votes)
 Tennessee, 7.72% (28,045 votes)
 Virginia, 8.01% (24,463 votes)
 Connecticut, 8.06% (44,574 votes)
 Wisconsin, 9.24% (93,946 votes)
 North Carolina, 9.87% (62,696 votes)

Tipping point state:
 Illinois, 14.65% (455,324 votes)

Statistics 
Counties with Highest Percent of Vote (Republican)
 Jackson County, Kentucky 96.52%
 Leslie County, Kentucky 94.51%
 Alpine County, California 94.23%
 Johnson County, Tennessee 93.74%
 Sevier County, Tennessee 92.57%

Counties with Highest Percent of Vote (Democratic)
 Jackson Parish, Louisiana 100.00%
 Armstrong County, South Dakota 100.00%
 Humphreys County, Mississippi 99.90%
 Edgefield County, South Carolina 99.67%
 Bamberg County, South Carolina 99.49%

See also 
 History of the United States (1918–1945)
 Inauguration of Herbert Hoover
 1928 United States House of Representatives elections
 1928 United States Senate elections
 Al Smith 1928 presidential campaign

References

Further reading 

 Andersen, Kristi. The Creation of a Democratic Majority: 1928–1936. (Chicago: University of Chicago Press, 1997)
 Bornet, Vaughn Davis.  "The Communist Party in the Presidential Election of 1928," Western Political Quarterly,  (1958), 11#3 pp. 514–538. In JSTOR
 Bornet, Vaughn Davis.  Labor Politics in a Democratic Republic: Moderation, Division, and Disruption in the Presidential Election of 1928 (1964)
Chiles, Robert. 2018. The Revolution of '28: Al Smith, American Progressivism, and the Coming of the New Deal. Cornell University Press.
 Coffman, Elesha. "The 'Religious Issue' in Presidential Politics." American Catholic Studies (2008) 119#4 pp 1–20
 Craig, Douglas B. After Wilson: The Struggle for Control of the Democratic Party, 1920–1934. (Chapel Hill: University of North Carolina Press, 1993)
 Doherty, Herbert J. "Florida and the Presidential Election of 1928." The Florida Historical Quarterly 26.2 (1947): 174–186.
 Goldberg, David Joseph. Discontented America: The United States in the 1920s. (Baltimore: Johns Hopkins University Press, 1999)
 Hostetler, Michael J.  "Gov. Al Smith Confronts the Catholic Question: The Rhetorical Legacy of the 1928 Campaign" Communication Quarterly, Vol. 46, 1998.
 Lichtman, Allan, Prejudice and the Old Politics: The Presidential Election of 1928. Chapel Hill, NC: University of North Carolina Press, 1979.
 Moore, Edmund A.  A Catholic Runs for President: The Campaign of 1928. Ronald Press, 1956.
 Rulli, Daniel F. "Campaigning in 1928: Chickens in Pots and Cars in Backyards," Teaching History: A Journal of Methods, Vol. 31, no. 1 (2006), pp. 42+
 Slayton, Robert A. Empire Statesman: The Rise and Redemption of Al Smith. New York: Free Press, 2001.
 Sweeney, James R. "Rum, Romanism, and Virginia Democrats: The Party Leaders and the Campaign of 1928." Virginia Magazine of History and Biography 90 (1982): 403–31. in JSTOR

Primary sources 
 Hoover, Herbert. The Memoirs of Herbert Hoover: The Cabinet and the Presidency, 1920–1933 (1952),
 Smith, Alfred E. Campaign Addresses 1929.
 Chester, Edward W  A guide to political platforms (1977) online
 Porter, Kirk H. and Donald Bruce Johnson, eds. National party platforms, 1840-1964 (1965) online 1840-1956

External links 

 1928 popular vote by counties
 Election of 1928 in Counting the Votes

 
Anti-Catholicism in the United States
Presidency of Herbert Hoover
Al Smith
Herbert Hoover